The Cormaia is a right tributary of the river Someșul Mare in Romania.

References

Rivers of Romania
Rivers of Bistrița-Năsăud County